The 1927 Gonzaga Bulldogs football team was an American football team that represented Gonzaga University during the 1927 college football season. In their third year under head coach Maurice J. "Clipper" Smith, the Bulldogs compiled a 5–3–1 record and outscored all opponents by a total of 154 to 59.

The team was led by quarterback Fanny Hunting. He ran 97 yards for a touchdown against Nevada. The team captain was Fred Baier. Baier's mother died in the grandstand at the start of Gonzaga's game against Washington State. Baier did not learn of his mother's death until he was taken out of the game in the fourth quarter due to an injury.

Schedule

References

Gonzaga
Gonzaga Bulldogs football seasons
Gonzaga Bulldogs football